ISO 2015 is a standard of the International Organization for Standardization (ISO), superseded by ISO standard ISO 8601. The standard ISO week numbering system was introduced in ISO 2015. ISO 2015 was issued as an international standard in 1976, technically identical to ISO Recommendation R 2015, from 1971.

References

02015